Blackdance is the third album by Klaus Schulze. It was originally released in 1974, and in 2007 was the twenty-fifth Schulze album reissued by Revisited Records. For the first time Schulze uses "real" synthesizers and a singer. "Voices of Syn" features Ernst Walter Siemon on vocals. Due to packaging and print errors on later releases, Blackdance was considered Schulze's fourth album for decades, until Klaus D. Müller, Schulze's biographer and publicity manager, discovered from searching through his personal diaries that Picture Music, thought to be the third album, was recorded after Blackdance. Despite this, the reissue labels Blackdance as Schulze's fourth album.

Track listing
All tracks composed by Klaus Schulze.

Personnel 
 Klaus Schulze – synthesizer, organ, piano, percussion, 12-string acoustic guitar
 Ernst Walter Siemon: voice (on "Voices of Syn")

External links
 Blackdance at the official site of Klaus Schulze
 

Klaus Schulze albums
1974 albums